David Wallace Crowder (born November 29, 1971), known professionally by his mononymous stage name Crowder since 2012, is an American contemporary Christian music singer, songwriter, multi-instrumentalist and author. He was the lead singer in the now defunct David Crowder Band, before he started his solo career in 2012 on sixstepsrecords and Sparrow Records labels. He released his first solo album. Neon Steeple, on May 27, 2014. Crowder released his first solo single off the album, "I Am", on November 25, 2013, which rose to the No. 3 position on the Christian Songs chart. American Prodigal, Crowder's second solo album, was released on September 23, 2016 and his third, I Know a Ghost, on November 9, 2018. His fourth solo album, Milk & Honey, released on June 11, 2021.

Background 

He was born David Wallace Crowder, on November 29, 1971, in Texarkana, Texas. He went to college at Baylor University in Waco, Texas.

Crowder was the lead vocalist of the David Crowder Band from 1996 until it was disbanded in 2012 when Crowder started his solo career on Sparrow Records imprint, sixstepsrecords. During the band's time together they released 16 singles through 6 studio albums, 2 live albums, 4 Extended Plays (EPs) and a compilation album.

Crowder released his debut solo studio album on May 27, 2014, Neon Steeple.  The lead single, "I Am", released on November 25, 2013, charted at No, 3 on the Billboard Christian Songs chart. "Come As You Are" achieved a Grammy nomination in 2015 for Best Contemporary Christian Music Performance/Song. 

His second solo album, American Prodigal, was released September 23, 2016. The first single, "Run Devil Run", was released on June 18, 2016. "Forgiven" was the second single released.

On September 19, 2018, Crowder announced a third solo album and released the first two singles, "Red Letters" and "Wildfire". The album, I Know a Ghost, was released on November 9, 2018.

In autumn 2021 - spring 2022, Crowder toured in the USA.

Discography

Studio albums

Other albums

EPs

Singles

As a lead artist

As a featured artist

Promotional singles
{| class="wikitable plainrowheaders" style=text-align:center;
|+ List of singles, with selected chart positions
! scope="col" rowspan="2" | Title
! scope="col" rowspan="2" | Year
! scope="col" colspan="2" | Peak chart positions
! scope="col" rowspan="2" | Album
|-
! scope="col" style="width:3em;font-size:90%;"| USChrist.
! scope="col" style="width:3em;font-size:90%;"| US Christ.Digital
|-
! scope="row"| "He Is"
| rowspan="3"| 2021
| 30 || 11
| rowspan="3"| Milk & Honey
|-
! scope="row"| "Milk & Honey"
| 37 || —
|-
! scope="row"| "The Anchor"
| — || —
|-
| colspan="5" style="font-size:90%"| "—" denotes a recording that did not chart.
|}

 Other charted songs 

 Music videos 

Awards

GMA Dove Awards

|-
! scope="row" rowspan="5" | 2015
| "Come As You Are"
| Song of the Year
| 
|-
| "Lift Your Head Weary Sinner (Chains)"
| Rock/Contemporary Song of the Year
| 
|-
| "Come As You Are"
| Pop/Contemporary Song of the Year
| 
|-
| rowspan="2" | Neon Steeple| Pop/Contemporary Album of the Year
| 
|-
| Recorded Music Packaging of the Year
| 
|-
! scope="row" rowspan="4" | 2017
| "Run Devil Run"
| Rock/Contemporary Recorded Song of the Year
| 
|-
| rowspan="2" | American Prodigal| Rock/Contemporary Album of the Year
| 
|-
| Recorded Music Packaging of the Year
| 
|-
| Run Devil Run
| Short Form Video of the Year
| 
|-
! scope="row" rowspan="2" | 2018
| rowspan="2" | "All My Hope"
| Song of the Year
| 
|-
| Pop/Contemporary Recorded Song of the Year
| 
|-
! scope="row" rowspan="4" | 2019
| "Red Letters"
| Song of the Year
| 
|-
| "Wildfire"
| Rock/Contemporary Recorded Song of the Year
| 
|-
| I Know a Ghost| Pop/Contemporary Album of the Year
| 
|-
| Red Letters
| Short Form Video of the Year
| 
|-
! scope="row" | 2021
| rowspan="2" | "Good God Almighty"
| Pop/Contemporary Recorded Song of the Year
| 
|-
! scope="row" rowspan="4" | 2022
| Song of the Year
| 
|-
| "Higher Power"
| Rock/Contemporary Recorded Song of the Year
| 
|-
| rowspan="2" | Milk & Honey| Pop/Contemporary Album of the Year
|  
|-
| Recorded Music Packaging of the Year
| 
|-
|}

 Notes 

 Books 
David Crowder has authored two books:
David Crowder, Praise Habit: Finding God in Sunsets and Sushi, NavPress, 2005.
David Crowder with Mike Hogan, Everybody Wants to Go to Heaven, but Nobody Wants to Die or (The Eschatology of Bluegrass)'', Relevant Books, 2006.

See also 
 David Crowder Band discography

References

External links
 
Official Facebook

1971 births
Living people
21st-century American non-fiction writers
21st-century Christians
American Christian writers
American evangelicals
American male musicians
American male non-fiction writers
American performers of Christian music
Musicians from Texas
People from Waco, Texas
Performers of contemporary Christian music
Sixstepsrecords artists
Sparrow Records artists
21st-century American male writers